Bryceville is an unincorporated community in Nassau County, Florida, United States. It is located on US 301, in the southwestern part of the county.

Area roads
Bryceville lies on US 301. CR 119 intersects to the north and travels west, and Otis Road intersects to the south and travels east.

Government and infrastructure
Nassau County Fire Rescue operates Station 60 in Bryceville.

Educational institutions
Nassau County School District operates public schools. Bryceville Elementary School serves grades K-5.  Most students attend school in nearby Callahan for grades 6–12.

Nassau County Public Library operates the Bryceville Library.

References

Unincorporated communities in Nassau County, Florida
Unincorporated communities in the Jacksonville metropolitan area
Unincorporated communities in Florida